Mevaseret Zion is a suburb of Jerusalem with the administrative status of a local council. Mevaseret Zion is composed of two distinct older townships, Maoz Zion and Mevaseret Yerushalayim, under the jurisdiction of one local council. The newer neighborhoods of Mevaseret Zion were not part of either settlement.

In  it had a population of 24,409, spread over 15 neighborhoods. It is the wealthiest municipality per capita in the Jerusalem District. Mevaseret Zion's current mayor is Yoram Shimon.

History

Castel area

Due to its strategic location, settlement in the area of Mevasseret Zion goes back to antiquity. The Romans built a fortress there, known as Castellum. On the ruins of this fortress, the Crusaders built a castle, Castellum Belveer, of which no trace remains.  Belveer is mentioned in a letter from Eraclius, Patriarch of Jerusalem, dated September 1187, in which he describes the slaughter of Christians "by the sword of Mafumetus the Unbeliever and his evil worshipper Saladin" and the Arab conquest of the town, which was renamed al-Qastal.

During the British Mandate of Palestine, the British referred to this district as "The Castle". The Arabs called it "al-Qastal", pronouncing the "t." The Jews called it "HaCástel" ("the Cástel").

In the 1948 Palestine war, battles took place here as Arabs and Jews fought for control of al-Qastal, which overlooked the main Tel Aviv-Jerusalem highway. Al-Qastal exchanged hands several times in the course of the fighting. The tides turned when the Arab commander Abd al-Qadir al-Husayni was killed. Many of the Arabs left their positions to attend al-Husayni's funeral at the Al-Aqsa Mosque on Friday, April 9. That same day, al-Qastal fell to the Yishuv forces, virtually unopposed.

Maoz Zion
Maoz Zion ("Stronghold of Zion") was established in 1951 to house new immigrants from Iraq, Kurdistan, North Africa and Iran who had been living in a ma'abara, or transit camp, at the foot of the Castel hill. Many were employed at the nearby Solel Boneh stone quarry.

Mevasseret Yerushalayim
Mevasseret Yerushalayim was established east of Ma'oz Zion in 1956 by Jewish immigrants from North Africa. It was located on a ridge near the armistice line, north of Motza. The residents worked in the fruit orchards in the Arazim Valley.

Unified local council
In 1963, Maoz Zion and Mevasseret Yerushalayim formed a joint local council, which was called Mevasseret Zion. The source of the name is the Book of Isaiah: "" – "Ascend a lofty mountain, O herald of joy to Zion".

Institutions and landmarks
The Har'el shopping mall is located at the entrance to Mevasseret Zion, near the Har'el interchange. The mall serves the residents of Mevasseret Zion, Maoz Zion, the surrounding communities, as well as travelers on Route 1. The shopping mall which includes some 80 businesses has been joined by the Jerusalem Mall on the other side of the highway at the entrance of Maoz Zion. Businesses included between both malls include Golf, s.wear, Magnolia Jewelers, Castro, Renoir and many others. The world's first kosher McDonald's opened there in 1995.
In addition to numerous Orthodox congregations, Mevasseret Zion also has a Reform congregation, Kehillat Mevasseret Zion, founded in 1993.

Education
Mevasseret Zion has 3 secular grade schools, one junior-high school and a high school, "Tichon Har'el". It also holds two religious schools.
 
Yeshivat Sha'arei Mevasseret Zion is located in Mevasseret Zion. It includes a kollel, mostly catering to adult Israeli men, and a gap year program for students from English-speaking high schools.

Archaeology
In April–May 2003, an archaeological salvage dig carried out on Nahal Sorek Street in Mevasseret Zion unearthed an ancient burial cave dating from the mid-Second Temple period.

Sports
Mevasseret Zion holds both a soccer team and a basketball team, both playing for low leagues.

 plays in Israel's , Israel's 5th league. It started as Hapoel Mevasseret Zion and then united with Ironi Abu Ghosh, and became the first Israeli team mixed from an Arab village and a Jewish town. In 2007 Mevasseret-Abu Ghosh was united with Hapoel Katamon, and then separated again. The team is built of Arab and Jewish players, and participated in international friendly tournaments for peace. The team plays in local soccer field called "", which means in Hebrew, the green field. The capacity is about 200 people.

The team plays in the local basketball court with a capacity of 300 seats.

Notable residents

Rachel Adato (born 1947), gynaecologist, lawyer and politician
Dan Bahat (born 1938), archaeologist
Aharon Appelfeld (1932–2018), novelist and Holocaust survivor
Itamar Ben Gvir, (born 1976 in Mevasseret Zion), politician   
 (1946–2012), neuropsychologist
Charlie Biton (born 1947), social activist and former politician
 (born 1937), politician
Martin van Creveld (born 1946), military historian and theorist
 (born 1954), author
 (born 1957), politician and national security expert
 (born 1951), policeman and politician
Josh Reinstein
 (born 1960), computer scientist and businessman
 (born 1958), politician
 (born 1944), military and politician

Sister cities
 White Plains, New York (2004)
 Sankt Augustin, Germany (2001)
 Calabasas, California (2012)

See also

1947–48 Civil War in Mandatory Palestine

References

External links
Municipality website 
Harel High School website 
Notes on an Iron Age four sheqel scale weight from Mevasseret Yerushalayim

Local councils in Jerusalem District
Populated places established in 1951
1951 establishments in Israel